Chalgrove Airfield  is a former Second World War airfield in Oxfordshire, England.

Opened in 1943, it was used by both the Royal Air Force and United States Army Air Forces. During the war, it was used primarily as a combat reconnaissance airfield. It was closed in late 1946.

Today, the airfield is primarily used by the Martin-Baker company for testing ejection seats.

It was announced on 6 September 2016 that Chalgrove Airfield had been the subject of a ministerial transfer from the MoD to the Homes and Communities Agency (now called Homes England), with a view to building a housing-led mixed-use development on part of the airfield as part of the South Oxfordshire District Council's Local Plan 2034. This is subject to review and consultation, with the examination-in-public starting in July 2020.

Homes England submitted an outline planning application on 19 June 2020 for 3,000 homes, a secondary and two primary schools, a new town centre and 40,000 square metres of employment space, along with community and leisure uses which will be determined by South Oxfordshire District Council.

History

United States Army Air Forces use
Chalgrove was allocated to the United States Army Air Forces (USAAF) by the Air Ministry on 1 November 1942. It was known as USAAF Station AAF-465 for security reasons by the USAAF during the war, and by which it was referred to instead of the location.

USAAF station units assigned to RAF Chalgrove were: 
 30th Service Group (VIII Air Force Service Command)
 493d and 494th Service Squadrons; HHS, 30th Service Group
 21st Weather Squadron
 324th Station Complement Squadron
 40th Mobile Communications Squadron
 49th Mobile Reclamation and Repair Squadron
 1078th Quartermaster Company
 1106th Signal Company
 1201st Military Police Company
 1464th Ordnance Medium Maintenance Company
 2251st Quartermaster Truck Company
 2060th Engineer Fire Fighting Platoon

10th Reconnaissance Group

The first residents of the airfield was the 10th Reconnaissance Group which arrived from Key Field, Mississippi in January 1944. The group consisted of the following operational squadrons:

 15th Tactical Reconnaissance Squadron
 30th Photographic Reconnaissance
 31st Photographic Reconnaissance 
 33rd Photographic Reconnaissance
 34th Photographic Reconnaissance
 423d/155th Photographic Reconnaissance

The 30th Photographic Reconnaissance Squadron (PRS) arrived in January and early February. The 31st, 33rd and 34th PRS became operational at Chalgrove in April.

The primary aircraft flown by the group consisted of photographic versions of the Lockheed P-38 Lightning (F-5) and North American P-51 Mustang (F-6). In addition, the unit also flew the Stinson L-1 Vigilant and L-5 Sentinel along with the Piper L-4 Grasshopper light observation aircraft.
 
In May 1944 the 30th PRS moved to RAF Middle Wallop and it was replaced by the 423rd Night Fighter Squadron with Douglas A-20 Havoc (F-3A) from RAF Charmy Down which was used for night photo-reconnaissance. In June the 423d was renamed the 155th Photo Reconnaissance Squadron.

After the invasion, the 15th TPRS moved into France first, to the Advanced Landing Ground at Rennes–Saint-Jacques, France (ALG A-27) on 10 July. The other squadrons of the 10th moved over the next few weeks, the last being the 155th which moved to France in mid-August.

25th Bombardment Group (Reconnaissance)
In August 1944 the 653d Bombardment Squadron of the 25th Bombardment Group based at RAF Watton moved to Chalgrove. The 653d was an Eighth Air Force unit equipped with special weather reconnaissance Mosquito PRXVI's which operated over the waters adjacent to the British Isles and occasionally to the Azores to obtain meteorological data. The squadron also flew over mainland Europe for weather information needed in planning operations.  In November 1945 the squadron was inactivated.

7th Reconnaissance Group
In March 1945 the 13th, 14th and 22nd Photographic Reconnaissance Squadrons from the VII Air Service Command 7th Reconnaissance Group moved to Chalgrove from RAF Mount Farm flying P-51 Mustangs (F-6). Fuselage codes were "ES" for the 13th PRS and "G2" for the 22nd. The unit also flew the Stinson L-5 Sentinel light observation aircraft.

The group was inactivated at the 4th Strategic Air Depot (Hitcham) on 21 November 1945.

Royal Air Force use
With the inactivation of the 25th Bomb Group, the USAAF returned the airfield to the RAF on 1 December 1945.

Post RAF use

With the end of military control, Chalgrove Airfield was leased by the Ministry of Defence to Martin-Baker in July 1946 for the development and testing of ejection seats. Although most of the hardstands have been removed over the years, all of the runways and perimeter track exist and are still in use by Martin-Baker. Two of the wartime T2 hangars are in use as part of the airfield and the Monument Industrial Estate site just to the south-east of the airfield contains some old USAAF buildings that were once part of the airfield.

Chalgrove Aerodrome has a CAA ordinary licence (number P683) that allows flights for the public transport of passengers or for flying instruction as authorised by the licensee (Martin-Baker (Engineering) Limited). The aerodrome is not licensed for night use. Runways 06/24 and 18/36 became unlicensed in 2012.

In 2016, under the A Better Defence Estate review, ownership of the site was transferred from the Ministry of Defence to Homes England with the intention of redeveloping the site for 3,000 homes.

In popular culture
Chalgrove appeared in an episode of the British TV series The Professionals, the Cessna 172 being used by an escaper supposedly crashing into an airfield building. An episode of the cult series The Prisoner also used Chalgrove, including sequences involving a Martin-Baker Gloster Meteor.

See also

List of former Royal Air Force stations

References

Citations

Bibliography

 Freeman, Roger A. (1994) UK airfields of the Ninth: then and now, London: Battle of Britain Prints International, 
 Maurer, Maurer (1983) Air Force combat units of World War II, Washington, D.C.: Office of Air Force History,

External links

 Martin-Baker Aircraft Company Ltd
 Chalgrove village
 30th Photo Reconnaissance Sqdrn
 33rd Photo Reconnaissance Sqdrn
 34th Photo Reconnaissance Sqdrn

Airports in England
Transport in Oxfordshire
Airfields of the VIII Air Service Command in the United Kingdom
Airfields of the IX Fighter Command in the United Kingdom
Airports in South East England